Galkynysh Square (Square of Revival) is a square in Ashgabat, Turkmenistan.  It sits at the intersection of Turkmenbashi and Galkynysh Avenues.

Landmarks on or near the square include:

 Palace of Congresses
 Oguzkhan Presidential Palace
 Nusai Hotel 
 Monument to the Constitution

See also 
Independence Square, Ashgabat
List of city squares

References 

Squares in Ashgabat